West Salisbury is an unincorporated community in Somerset County, Pennsylvania, United States. The community is located along Pennsylvania Route 669 on the western border of Salisbury. West Salisbury had a post office from March 10, 1900, until July 23, 2011; it still has its own ZIP code, 15565.

References

Unincorporated communities in Somerset County, Pennsylvania
Unincorporated communities in Pennsylvania